Poochakkaru Mani Kettum (പൂച്ചക്കാര് മണിക്കെട്ടും) is a 1992 Indian Malayalam film, directed by Thulasidas, starring Mukesh, Siddique, Lakshmi and Sunitha in the lead roles.This film is remade in Telugu as 'Pelli Gola'.

Plot
Kunjukutti Amma is the matriarch of the family, and wishes to marry off her grandson to one of his cousins. Seeking the wealth that could come through this relationship the parents of the three cousins compete for Kochukrishnan to be their son-in-law. However, Kochukrishnan has other plans. He and his friend Hareendran attempt to free themselves from this quandary. The sneaky tactics topples down. However, familial understanding and the core love they have as a family resolves everything.

Cast

Soundtrack
"Chandanathoniyumay" - K. S. Chithra
"Maalathi Mandapangal" - Sujatha Mohan, M. G. Sreekumar
"Sangeethame Samaje" - K. S. Chithra, M. G. Sreekumar
"Thinkal Noyambin" - K. S. Chithra, M. G. Sreekumar

References

External links

1992 films
1990s Malayalam-language films
Films scored by Johnson